Wyoming Highway 253 (WYO 253) is a  state road in eastern Natrona county located southeast of Evansville, Wyoming, called Hat Six Road.

Route description
Wyoming Highway 253 begins its southern end near the Natrona-Converse County Line, southeast of Casper and Evansville, at Natrona County Route 606 (Hat Six Road) and Natrona County Route 607 (Smith Creek Road). From there, WYO 253 travels generally northwest. The mileposts for Highway 253 increase from north to south.

Major intersections

References

Official 2003 State Highway Map of Wyoming

External links 

Wyoming State Routes 200-299
WYO 253 - US 20/US 26/US 87/WYO 256 to I-25
WYO 253 - I-25 to Natrona CR 606/607
Transportation in Natrona County, Wyoming
253